This is a list of American football players who have played for the New Orleans Saints in the National Football League (NFL).  It includes players that have played at least one match in the NFL regular season.  The New Orleans Saints franchise was founded in 1967.  The Saints have won one Super Bowl (Super Bowl XLIV), have one conference championship, and have five division championships.

A
Danny Abramowicz,
Michael Adams,
Sam Adams,
Scott Adams,
Vashone Adams,
Remi Ayodele,
Margene Adkins,
Ink Aleaga,
Vincent Alexander,
Eric Allen,
James Allen,
Kenderick Allen,
Terry Allen,
Gerald Alphin,
Ashley Ambrose,
Morten Andersen,
Dick Anderson,
Gary Anderson, Jesse Anderson,
Sheldon Andrus,
Tyrone Anthony,
Bert Askson,
Pete Athas,
Doug Atkins,
Gene Atkins,
Cliff Austin

B
Mario Bates,
Steve Baumgartner,
Joique Bell,
Mike Bell,
Ladell Betts,
Kenny Bordelon,
Drew Brees,
Johnny Brewer,
Aaron Brooks,
Alex Brown,
Charles Brown,
Brandon Browner,
Vince Buck,
Jermon Bushrod,
Reggie Bush,
John "Reb" Brown

C
Earl Campbell,
Joek Campbell,
James Campen,
Jonathan Casillas,
Clarence Chapman,
Henry Childs,
Mike Ciepela, Bruce Clark, 
Danny Clark,
Kelvin Clark,
Robert Clark,
Vinnie Clark,
Phil Clarke,
Willie Clay,
Cam Cleeland,
Charlie Clemons,
Bill Cody,
Mike Cofer,
Daniel Colchico,
Don Coleman,
Kerry Collins,
Larry Collins,
Wayne Colman,
Marques Colston,
Chuck Commiskey,
Albert Connell,
Darion Conner,
Bill Contz,
Ernie Conwell,
Toi Cook,
Brandin Cooks,
Larry Coombs,
Josh Cooper,
Richard Cooper,
Terrance Copper,
Lou Cordileone,
Bruce Cortez,
Chad Cota,
John Covington,
Bryan Cox,
Curome Cox,
Mike Crangle,
Keyuo Craver,
Bob Creech,
Chuck Crist,
Sylvester Croom,
Ron Crosby,
Billy Cundiff,
Carl Cunningham,
Gary Cuozzo,
Eric Cuffee
Robert Canselo Jr.,

D
Oakley Dalton,
Chase Daniel,
Jason David,
Jeff Davidson,
Bob Davis,
Dave Davis,
Dick Davis,
Don Davis,
Isaac Davis,
Norman Davis,
Ted Davis,
Travis Davis,
Travis Davis,
Troy Davis,
Sean Dawkins,
Lawrence Dawsey,
Stacey Dawsey,
Joe DeForest,
Jack DeGrenier,
Jack Del Rio,
Jake Delhomme,
Curtis Deloatch,
Tom Dempsey,
Lee DeRamus,
Jim DeRatt,
Glenn Derby,
John Didion,
Ernest Dixon,
Ronnie Dixon,
Conrad Dobler,
Al Dodd,
Jim Dombrowski,
Tom Donovan,
Andy Dorris,
John Douglas,
Marques Douglas,
Bobby Douglass,
Marcus Dowdell,
Tyronne Drakeford,
Kenny Duckett,
Jonathan Dumbauld,
Jo-Lonn Dunbar,
Jubilee Dunbar,
Karl Dunbar,
Vaughn Dunbar,
Charlie Durkee,
Bill Dusenberry,
Duane Dorsey

E
Quinn Early,
Brad Edelman,
Kelvin Edwards,
Dannell Ellerbe,
Ted Elliott,
Tony Elliott,
Sedrick Ellis,
Frank Emanuel,
Tory Epps,
Russell Erxleben,
Lawrence Estes,
Chuck Evans,
Heath Evans,
Jahri Evans,
Troy Evans,
Willie Evans,
Jim Everett

F
Julian Fagan,
Jeff Faine,
Chris Farasopoulos,
Hap Farber,
John Farquhar,
Jeff Faulkner,
Joe Federspiel,
Happy Feller,
Eric Felton,
James Fenderson,
Gill Fenerty,
Jim Ferguson,
Paul Fersen,
Ross Fichtner,
Jitter Fields,
Mark Fields,
Bill Fifer,
Alfred Fincher,
Mike Fink,
Roger Finnie,
Levar Fisher,
Jim Flanigan,
Spencer Folau,
Jerry Fontenot,
Henry Ford,
James Ford,
Brian Forde,
John Fourcade,
Keith Fourcade,
Bobby Fowler,
P. J. Franklin,
Todd Franz,
Jim Fraser,
Paul Frazier,
Reggie Freeman,
Toni Fritsch,
Scott Fujita,
Johnny Fuller,
Mike Fultz

G
Hokie Gajan,
Tony Galbreath,
Kendall Gammon,
Junior Galette,
Wayne Gandy,
Jim Garcia,
Talman Gardner,
Len Garrett,
Russell Gary,
Randall Gay,
James Geathers,
Ronnie Ghent,
Donnie Gibbs,
Antonio Gibson,
Daren Gilbert,
John Gilliam,
Matt Giordano,
Steve Gleason,
Vencie Glenn,
Andrew Glover,
La'Roi Glover,
Robert Goff,
Dan Goich,
Eugene Goodlow,
Jonathan Goodwin,
Darren Gottschalk,
Toby Gowin,
Jimmy Graham,
Hoyle Granger,
Charles Grant,
Cie Grant,
Cecil Gray,
David Gray,
Kevin Gray,
Leon Gray,
Mel Gray,
Arthur Green,
Howard Green,
Paul Green,
Victor Green,
Donovan Greer,
Jabari Greer,
Ted Gregory,
Bob Gresham,
DeJuan Groce,
Elois Grooms,
Earl Gros,
Lee Gross,
Jeff Groth,
Terry Guess,
Eric Guliford,
Mark Gunn,
Ross Gwinn

H
Az-Zahir Hakim,
Mike Halapin,
Lamont Hall,
Tom Hall,
Willie Hall,
Andy Hamilton,
Lynell Hamilton,
Uhuru Hamiter,
Norman Hand,
Jim Hanna,
Brian Hansen,
Greg Harding,
Larry Hardy,
Edd Hargett,
Anthony Hargrove,
Deveron Harper,
Roman Harper,
Bill Harris,
Corey Harris,
Herbert Harris,
Ike Harris,
Rod Harris,
Victor Harrison,
Ben Hart,
Jeff Hart,
Tommy Hart,
Garrett Hartley,
George Harvey,
Richard Harvey, Jr. 
Richard Harvey, Sr.
Andre Hastings,
Kevin Haverdink,
Sam Havrilak,
Michael Hawthorne,
Billie Hayes,
Mercury Hayes,
James Haynes,
Michael Haynes (DT),
Michael Haynes (WR),
Major Hazelton,
Bobby Hebert,
Devery Henderson,
Jimmy Heidel,
Othello Henderson,
Don Herrmann,
Jim Hester,
Ray Hester,
Chris Hewitt,
Craig "Ironhead" Heyward,
Jay Hilgenberg,
Joel Hilgenberg,
John Hill,
Joshua J Hill,
Lonzell Hill,
Randal Hill,
Taysome Hill,
Dalton Hilliard,
Keno Hills,
Zachary Hilton,
Glen Ray Hines,
Terry Hoage,
Billy Hobbs,
Daryl Hobbs,
Billy Joe Hobert,
Milford Hodge,
Sedrick Hodge,
Tommy Hodson,
Augie Hoffmann,
Curtis Holden,
Sam Holden,
Montrae Holland,
Hugo Hollas,
Stan Holloway,
Jack Holmes,
Chris Horn,
Joe Horn,
Aaron Hosack,
Derrick Hoskins,
Kevin Houser,
Walter Housman,
Darren Howard,
Gene Howard,
Reggie Howard,
Delles Howell,
John Huard,
Dave Hubbard,
Nat Hudson,
Pat Hughes,
Tyrone Hughes,
Tory Humphrey,
Kevin Hunt,
Earnest Hunter,
Bill Hurley,
Fred Hyatt

I
Clint Ingram,
Kevin Ingram,
Mark Ingram II,
Ken Irvin,
Qadry Ismail,
Steve Israel,
Chris Ivory

J
Ernie Jackson,
Grady Jackson,
Greg Jackson,
Jonathan Jackson,
Rickey Jackson,
Willie Jackson,
Harry Jacobs,
Kendyl Jacox,
Van Jakes,
Philip James,
Garland Jean-Batiste,
Haywood Jeffires,
Dameian Jeffries,
Malcolm Jenkins,
Stanford Jennings,
Paul Jetton,
Alonzo Johnson,
Benny Johnson,
Bobby Johnson
Carl Johnson,
Dirk Johnson,
Earl Johnson,
Eric Johnson,
J. R. Johnson,
Joe Johnson,
John Johnson,
Nate Johnson,
Tony Johnson,
Tyrone Johnson,
Undra Johnson,
Vaughan Johnson,
Walter Johnson,
Andrew Jones,
Brian Jones,
Clarence Jones,
Donta Jones,
Ernest Jones,
J. J. Jones,
Jamal Jones,
Jerry Jones,
Julius Jones,
Kim Jones,
Mike Jones,
Ray Jones,
Reggie Jones,
Selwyn Jones,
Tebucky Jones,
Buford Jordan,
Jimmy Jordan,
Keith Joseph,
Tom Jurich

K
Kevin Kaesviharn,
Ken Kaplan,
Robert Canselo Jr.,
Jim Kearney,
Curtis Keaton,
Mike Keim,
Les Kelley,
Mike Kelly,
Rob Kelly,
Florian Kempf,
Derek Kennard,
Eddie Kennison,
Billy Kilmer,
Elbert Kimbrough,
Ed King,
Rick Kingrea,
Keith Kirkwood,
Alan Kline,
Greg Knafelc,
Roger Knight,
Sammy Knight,
Shawn Knight,
David Knowles,
Joe Kohlbrand,
David Kopay,
Steve Korte,
Jim Kovach,
Kent Kramer,
Tommy Kramer,
John Krimm,
Jake Kupp,
Jake Kuresa,
Bob Kuziel

L
Dave Lafary,
Morris LaGrand,
Antwan Lake,
Phil LaPorta,
Babe Laufenberg,
Nate Lawrie,
Odell Lawson,
Josh "Bernard" Lay,
Bill Leach,
Scott Leach,
Bivian Lee,
Carl Lee,
Mark Lee,
Tyrone Legette,
Brad Leggett,
Earl Leggett,
Lance Legree,
Rodney Leisle,
Mike Lemon,
Derrick Lewis,
Gary Lewis (DL),
Gary Lewis (RB),
Marvin Lewis,
Michael Lewis,
Reggie Lewis,
Rodney Lewis,
John Leypoldt,
Errol Linden,
Dale Lindsey,
Toni Linhart,
Louis Lipps,
Earl Little,
Andy Livingston,
Greg Loberg,
Obert Logan,
Chip Lohmiller,
Dave Long,
Joe Don Looney,
Tony Lorick,
Sean Lumpkin,
Hendrick Lusk,
Chase Lyman,
Dicky Lyons

M
Cedric Mack,
Milton Mack,
Archie Manning,
Ken Marchiol,
Doug Marrone,
Jim Marsalis,
Olindo Mare,
James Marshall,
Chris Martin,
D'Artagnan Martin,
Eric Martin,
Jamie Martin,
Wayne Martin,
Mark Martinez,
Rich Martini,
Robert Massey,
Kevin Mathis,
Reggie Mathis,
Pascal Matla,
Henry Matthews,
Andy Maurer,
Rich Mauti,
Brett Maxie,
Alvin Maxson,
Jermane Mayberry,
Michael Mayes,
Rueben Mayes,
Fred McAfee,
Deuce McAllister,
Don McCall,
Bill McClard,
J. J. McCleskey,
Andy McCollum,
Dave McCormick,
Larry McCoy,
Fred McCrary,
Earl McCullouch,
Wayne McGarity,
Phil McGeoghan,
Ralph McGill,
Gene McGuire,
Toddrick McIntosh,
Corey McIntyre,
Mike McKenzie,
Ronald McKinnon,
Dana McLemore,
Mark McMillian,
Rod McNeill,
Tom McNeill,
Adrian McPherson,
Leon McQuay,
Robert Meachem,
Tyler Mehaffey,
Terrence Melton,
Guido Merkens,
Jim Merlo,
Casey Merrill,
Mark Meseroll,
Darren Mickell,
Rick Middleton,
Steve Mike-Mayer,
Billy Miller,
Junior Miller,
Les Miller,
Mike Miller,
Sam Mills,
Brian Milne,
Lincoln Minor,
Derrell Mitchell,
Keith Mitchell,
Kevin Mitchell,
Marvin Mitchell,
Mel Mitchell,
Alex Molden,
Derrius Monroe,
Marv Montgomery,
Monte Montgomery,
Doug Mooers,
Derland Moore,
Eric Moore,
Jerald Moore,
Jerry Moore,
Lance Moore,
Reynaud Moore,
John Mooring,
Mike Morgan,
Chris Morris,
Don Morrison,
Bobby Morse,
Thomas Morstead,
Chad Morton,
Chuck Muncie,
Brad Muster,
Tommy Myers,
DeShone Myles

N
Chris Naeole,
Rob Nairne,
Lorenzo Neal,
Richard Neal,
Derrick Ned,
Jamar Nesbit,
Elijah Nevett,
Robert Newkirk,
Bob Newland,
Anthony Newman,
Patrick Newman,
Billy Newsome,
Richard Newsome,
Calvin Nicholson,
Rob Ninkovich,
Jim Ninowski,
Moran Norris,
Craig Novitsky,
Doug Nussmeier,
Vic Nyvall

O
Ken O'Neal,
Steve O'Neal,
J. T. O'Sullivan,
Ray Ogden,
Onome Ojo,
Chris Oldham,
Jim Otis,
Louis Oubre,
Artie Owens,
Joe Owens,
John Owens,
Tinker Owens

P
Shane Pahukoa,
Tyler Palko,
Dick Palmer,
Emile Palmer,
Joel Parker,
Steve Parker,
Dave Parks,
Rick Partridge,
Jerome Pathon,
Mark Pattison,
Whitney Paul,
Scott Pelluer,
Petey Perot,
Brett Perriman,
Darren Perry,
Vernon Perry,
Wilmont Perry,
Rob Petitti,
Stan Petry,
Anwar Phillips,
Jess Phillips,
Kim Phillips,
Dino Philyaw,
Jim Pietrzak,
Julian Pittman,
Elijah Pitts,
Ray Poage,
Johnnie Poe,
Bob Pollard,
Tommy Polley,
Keith Poole,
Nate Poole,
Chris Port,
Rufus Porter,
Tracy Porter,
Marvin Powell,
Steve Preece,
Elex Price,
Marcus Price,
Joe Profit,
Remi Prudhomme

R
Nate Ramsey,
Steve Ramsey,
Walter Rasby,
Rocky Rasley,
Ricky Ray,
Ken Reaves,
Rusty Rebowe,
Glen Redd,
Jake Reed,
Don Reese,
Chris Reis,
Mike Rengel,
Tutan Reyes,
Steve Rhem,
Benny Ricardo,
Floyd Rice,
Mike Richey,
Preston Riley,
Victor Riley,
Tim Riordan,
Ray Rissmiller,
Marcellus Rivers,
Carl Roaches,
Willie Roaf,
Austin Robbins,
Walter Roberts,
Craig Robinson,
Darien Robinson,
Courtney Roby,
Jeff Rodenberger,
Derrick Rodgers,
Bill Roe,
George Rogers,
Jimmy Rogers,
Steve Rogers,
Baron Rollins,
Jacob Rosales, 
George Rose,
Scott Ross,
Tom Roth,
Jim Rourke,
Tom Roussel,
Dave Rowe,
Mark Royals,
Orlando Ruff,
Paul Ryczek

S
Pio Sagapolutele,
Pat Saindon,
Bill Sandeman,
Scott Sanderson,
Bill Saul,
Josh Savage,
Nicky Savoie,
Greg Scales,
Joe Scarpati,
Roy Schmidt,
Terry Schmidt,
Adam Schreiber,
Randy Schultz,
Kurt Schumacher,
Don Schwartz,
Brian Schweda,
Steve Scifres,
Bobby Scott,
Lindsay Scott,
Malcolm Scott,
Paul Seal,
Kyle Sepulveda,
Chad Setterstrom,
Siddeeq Shabazz,
Scott Shanle,
Bob Shaw,
Rickie Shaw,
Derrick Shepard,
John Shinners,
Heath Shuler,
Don Shy,
Ricky Siglar,
Brian Simmons,
Dave Simmons,
Jerry Simmons,
Michael Simmons,
Mark Simoneau,
Ed Simonini,
Chuck Slaughter,
T. J. Slaughter,
David Sloan,
Scott Slutzker,
Torrance Small,
Joel Smeenge,
Antowain Smith,
Brady Smith,
Cedric Smith,
Darrin Smith,
Dwight Smith,
Irv Smith,
Kenny Smith,
Lamar Smith,
Royce Smith,
Shaun Smith,
Terrelle Smith,
Vinson Smith,
Will Smith,
Ronnie Lee South,
Ernest Spears,
Jimmy Spencer,
Maurice Spencer,
C. J. Spiller,
Mike Spivey,
Darren Sproles,
Ken Stabler,
Dave Stachelski,
Donté Stallworth,
Israel Stanley,
Scott Stauch,
Aaron Stecker,
Greg Stemrick,
Howard Stevens,
Jimmy Stewart,
Monty Stickles,
Terry Stieve,
Jon Stinchcomb,
Tom Stincic,
Fred Stokes,
Mike Stonebreaker,
Steve Stonebreaker,
Omar Stoutmire,
Tommie Stowers,
Mike Strachan,
Eli Strand,
Zach Strief,
Jim Strong,
William Strong,
Jerry Sturm,
Fred Sturt,
Johnathan Sullivan,
Doug Sutherland,
Jon Sutton,
Reggie Sutton,
Karl Sweetan,
Pat Swilling,
Clovis Swinney,
Pat Swoopes,
Rich Szaro,
Dave Szymakowski

T
Don Talbert,
Derrick Taylor,
James Taylor,
Jim Taylor,
Keith Taylor,
Mike Taylor,
Daryl Terrell,
Corey Terry,
James Thaxton,
Charlie Thomas,
Curtland Thomas,
Fred Thomas,
Henry Thomas,
Hollis Thomas,
Joe Thomas,
Joey Thomas,
Michael Thomas,
Pierre Thomas,
Speedy Thomas,
Aundra Thompson,
Bennie Thompson,
Bobby Thompson,
Dave Thompson,
Don Thorp,
Junior Thurman,
John Tice,
Mike Tilleman,
Faddie Tillman,
Richard Todd,
Alvin Toles,
Billy Joe Tolliver,
Jared Tomich,
Darrell Toussaint,
Willie Townes,
Steve Trapilo,
Winfred Tubbs,
Joe Tuipala,
Willie Tullis,
Kyle Turley,
Renaldo Turnbull,
Floyd Turner,
Gunnard Twyner,
Toussaint Tyler

U
Jeff Uhlenhake,
Max Unger

V
Kenny Vaccaro,
Jim Van Wagner, 
Skip Vanderbundt,
Phil Vandersea,
Mike Verstegen,
Jonathan Vilma

W
Terrence Wagner,
Frank Wainright,
Dwight Walker,
Jeff Walker,
Mike Walker,
Wesley Walls,
Steve Walsh,
Carl Ward,
Chris Ward,
Phillip Ward,
Ron Warner,
Frank Warren,
Dave Washington,
Mickey Washington,
Mike Waters,
Courtney Watson,
John Watson,
Mike Watson,
Frank Wattelet,
Dave Waymer,
Fred Weary,
Steve Weatherford,
Cephus Weatherspoon,
Ron Weissenhofer,
Claxton Welch,
Joe Wendryhoski,
Greg Westbrooks,
Austin Wheatley,
Ernie Wheelwright,
Creston Whitaker,
Mitch White,
Willie Whitehead,
Dave Whitsell,
Fred Whittingham,
Ricky Whittle,
Tom Wickert,
Bob Wicks,
Josh Wilcox,
Jim Wilks,
Boo Williams,
Brian Williams,
Brooks Williams,
Del Williams,
James Williams,
Joe Williams,
John Williams,
Larry Williams,
Melvin Willams,
Ralph Williams,
Richard Williams,
Ricky Williams,
Wally Williams,
Willie Williams,
Donald Willis,
Len Willis,
Klaus Wilmsmeyer,
Dave Wilson,
Jerry Wilson,
Ray Wilson,
Robert Wilson,
Tim Wilson,
Troy Wilson,
Wade Wilson,
Wayne Wilson,
Jeff Winans,
Doug Winslow,
George Winslow,
DeMond Winston,
Dennis Winston,
Wimpy Winther,
Scott Woerner,
Gary Wood,
John Wood,
Robert Woods,
Marv Woodson,
Barry Word,
Danny Wuerffel,
Doug Wyatt,
Renaldo Wynn

Y
Garo Yepremian,
Bob Young,
Brian Young,
Cecil Young,
Kevin Young,
Tyrone Young,
Usama Young,
George Youngblood,
Dave Yovanovits

Z
Emanuel Zanders, 
Ray Zellars

References

 

New O
 
players
Curtis Martin played the wide receiver position in the mid to late 1970s.